The Battle of the Belly River was the last major conflict between the Cree (the Iron Confederacy) and the Blackfoot Confederacy, and the last major battle between First Nations on Canadian soil.

The battle took place within the present limits of the city of Lethbridge on the banks of the Oldman River, which at the time of the battle, was called the Belly River. A devastating outbreak of smallpox had reduced the strength of the Blackfoot, and a Cree war party had come south in late October 1870 to take advantage of that weakness. An advance party of Crees had stumbled upon a Peigan camp and decided to attack instead of informing the main Cree body of their find. Soon word passed to other Blackfoot, Blood and Peigan camps in the immediate area, and warriors were sent to join battle. After several hours of trading shots, a Blackfoot party gained the high ground and made the Cree positions untenable. The retreat became a rout, and up to 300 Cree warriors were killed trying to make their escape.

Approximately a year after the battle, the Cree and Blackfoot made a formal peace.  This was formalized by Crowfoot, a Blackfoot chief, ritually adopting Poundmaker, an up-and-coming Cree leader in 1873. Treaty No.7, between the Blackfoot Confederacy and the Crown, was signed in 1877. In 1906, the town of Lethbridge was founded near the battle site. The battle itself is commemorated in Indian Battle Park.

See also
Fort Whoop-Up
Jerry Potts

References

External links
The Shrine of Dreams

History of Lethbridge
First Nations history
Cree
Blackfoot Confederacy
Belly River
Belly River
Belly River
1870 in Canada
Belly River
History of the Northwest Territories
October 1870 events
Events of National Historic Significance (Canada)